The 2022 Team Long Track World Championship also called the Long Track of Nations was the 14th annual FIM Team Long Track World Championship. The final took place on 26 May 2022 in Herxheim, Germany. The 2020 and 2021 events had been cancelled due to the COVID-19 pandemic.

Germany won the event for the ninth time, with two times individual world champion Erik Riss returning to the longtrack after a long break and gaining the crucial heat win in the final that saw Germany beat the Czech Republic by virtue of the race win. Mathieu Trésarrieu performed superbly for France but was unable to gain the support required from his team.

Results
  Herxheim
 26 May 2022

See also
 2022 Individual Long Track World Championship

References

Team Long Track World Championship